Eetookashoo Bay is a waterway in Qikiqtaaluk Region, Nunavut, Canada. It is located at the northern end of Axel Heiberg Island between Cape Thomas Hubbard and Cape Stallworthy. The bay is named in honor of Eetookashoo (Itukassuk), one of the Inuit who had traveled with Frederick Cook and Donald Baxter MacMillan.

References
 Atlas of Canada

Bays of Qikiqtaaluk Region
Sverdrup Islands